Boris Osipovich Bogdanov (1884–1960) was a Menshevik revolutionary active in the February Revolution in 1917. However, following the Bolshevik seizure of power in October 1917 he remained politically active against their regime.

Participation in February Revolution
Bogdanov was involved in the formation of the Petrograd Soviet.

Life in prison and exile
He was arrested on 27 December 1922 and was sentenced to two years in the Pertominsk. Here he became the representative of the Mensheviks in the camp and signed a telegram alongside Georgy Kachorovsky, representing the Socialist Revolutionaries and Ivan Charin representing the Anarchists complaining to the Soviet authorities that their human rights had been violated by the non delivery of letters and parcels sent to them. In June 1923 he was transferred to the Solovki prison camp on Solovetsky Islands. He remained in prison or exile for the rest of his life. During this period he did some work as an economist. Despite suffering a stroke in 1952, he was only released after a second stroke in 1956. He was rehabilitated at this time, but was still stigmatised as politically unreliable by the Soviet authorities.

References

Mensheviks
1884 births
1960 deaths